The 2019 BWF World Championships was a badminton tournament which was held from 19 to 25 August 2019 at St. Jakobshalle in Basel, Switzerland.

Host city selection
Basel was chosen to be the host of the 2019 edition of the championships over 2020 Summer Olympics host city, Tokyo. The bid were approved by the Badminton World Federation during a council meeting in Kuala Lumpur, Malaysia.

Schedule
Five events were held.

All times are local (UTC+2).

Medal summary

Medal table

Medalists

Players

Number of participants

Players participating in two events

Performance by nation

See also
2019 BWF Para-Badminton World Championships, also hosted in Basel.

References

External links
Official website
BWF website

 
2018
World Championships
BWF World Championships
2019 BWF World Championships
BWF World Championships
Sports competitions in Basel